The 1990–91 Coupe de France was the 74th Coupe de France, France's annual national football cup competition. It was won by AS Monaco.

Round of 16

Quarter-finals

Semi-finals

Final

Topscorer
Jean-Pierre Papin (7 goals)

References

French federation

1990–91 in French football
1990-91
1990–91 domestic association football cups